Lekë III Dukagjini (1410–1481), mostly known as Lekë Dukagjini, was a 15th-century member of the Albanian nobility, from the Dukagjini family. A contemporary of Skanderbeg, Dukagjini is known for the Kanuni i Lekë Dukagjinit, a code of law instituted among the tribes of northern Albania.

Biography 
The Dukagjini Principality stretched from Northern Albania and into modern Kosovo. The western part of Kosovo, sometimes referred to as Rrafshi i Dukagjinit or Dukagjin, takes its name after the Dukagjini family. Until 1444 he was pronoier of Koja Zaharia.  He took over the county from his father Prince Pal II Dukagjini in 1446, who appears to have died of apoplexy.

Dukagjini fought under the command of Skanderbeg against the Ottomans during the last two years of the legendary war of Skanderbeg. During times of peace they also fought against one another, as Albanian loyalties came and went during that period of their history. Lekë Dukagjini ambushed and killed Lekë Zaharia Altisferi, prince of Dagnum. The two princes had been in dispute over who should marry Irene Dushmani. Irene was the only child of Lekë Dushmani, prince of Zadrima. In 1445, the Albanian princes had been invited to the wedding of Skanderbeg's younger sister, Mamica, who was being married to Muzaka Thopia. Irene entered the wedding and hostilities began. Dukagjini asked Irene to marry him but Zaharia, drunk, saw this and assaulted Dukagjini. Some princes attempted to stop the fight, but only more people became involved, resulting in several deaths until peace was established. Neither of the two antagonists had suffered any physical damage, but after the event Dukagjini was morally humiliated. Two years later, in 1447, in an act of revenge, Dukagjini ambushed and killed Zaharia.
However, original Venetian documents contradict this account by showing that this murder happened in 1444. According to Venetian chronicler Stefano Magno it was Nicholas Dukagjin, Zaharia's vassal, who killed Lekë Zaharia in the battle, not Lekë as stated by Marin Barleti. 

Nonetheless, the death of Zaharia left his princedom with no successor, resulting in his mother handing the fortress over to Venetian Albania, a stretch of possessions of the Republic of Venice. When Skanderbeg tried (unsuccessfully) to capture Dagnum in 1447 this began the Albanian–Venetian War (1447–1448). In March 1451 Lekë Dukagjini and Božidar Dushmani planned to attack Venetian controlled Drivast. Their plot was discovered and Božidar was forced to flee into exile.
In 1459 Skanderbeg's forces captured the fortress of Sati from the Ottoman Empire and Skanderbeg ceded it to Venice in order to secure a cordial relationship with Signoria before he sent his troops to Italy to help King Ferdinand to regain and maintain his kingdom after the death of king Alfonso V of Aragon. Before the Venetians took over the control of Sati, Skanderbeg captured it and the surrounding area, driving Lekë Dukagjini and his forces away, because he was opposed to Skanderbeg and destroyed Sati before the Venetian takeover.

Dukagjini continued to fight with limited success against the Ottoman Empire, carrying on as the leader of the League of Lezhë after the death of Skanderbeg, until 1479. At times his forces united with the Venetians with the blessing of the Pope.

Legacy 

The Law of Lek Dukagjini (kanun) was named after Lekë Dukagjini who codified the customary laws of the Albanian highlands. Although researchers of history and customs of Albania usually refer to Gjeçovi's text of the Kanuni as the only existing version which is uncontested and written by Lekë Dukagjini, it was actually incorrect. The text of the Kanuni, often contested and with many different interpretations which significantly evolved since 15th century, was only named after Dukagjini. Whilst identifying Skanderbeg as the "dragon prince" who dared to fight against any foe, chronicles portray Dukagjini as the "angel prince" who, with dignity and wisdom, ensured the continuity of the Albanian identity.

The set of laws were active in practice for a long time, but it was not gathered and codified until the late 19th century by Shtjefën Gjeçovi. The most infamous laws of Kanuni are those regulating blood feuds. Blood feuds have started once again in Albania (and have since spread to other parts of Albania, and even to expatriates abroad) after the fall of communism in the early 1990s, having been outlawed for many years during the regime of Enver Hoxha, and contained by the relatively closed borders.

Dukagjini's military campaigns against the Ottomans had limited success; he also lacked the ability to unite the country and the Albanian people in the way that Skanderbeg had. Loyalties wavered, and splintered, betrayals were common, and Albania fell into complete submission to the Ottomans by the end of the 15th century.

See also 
Siege of Shkodra
Dukagjini family

References

1410 births
1481 deaths
Albanian Roman Catholics
Leke
Medieval Albanian nobility
15th-century Albanian people
Albanian military personnel